Anita Takes a Chance (Spanish: Anita no pierde el tren, Catalan: Anita no perd el tren) is a 2001 film directed by Ventura Pons.

Plot
Anita loses her lifetime job as a cinema attendant when the new owner wants to tear down the old theatre to build a new multiplex theatre. She continues going  to the cinema place where she  befriends a married excavator operator, Antonio, and she falls in love.

See also 
 List of Spanish films of 2001

References

External links

2001 films
2000s Catalan-language films
Films directed by Ventura Pons
Films set in a movie theatre
Films set in Barcelona
Spanish drama films
2000s Spanish-language films
2000s Spanish films